Gabriele Badorek (born 20 September 1952 in Rostock) is a former East German handball player who competed in the 1976 Summer Olympics.

In 1976 she won the silver medal with the East German team. She played all five matches and scored three goals.

External links
profile

1952 births
Living people
Sportspeople from Rostock
People from Bezirk Rostock
German female handball players
Handball players at the 1976 Summer Olympics
Olympic handball players of East Germany
Olympic silver medalists for East Germany
Olympic medalists in handball
Medalists at the 1976 Summer Olympics
20th-century German women